Michael Snedden (born 20 September 1992) is a New Zealand cricketer. He made his List A debut for Auckland in the 2018–19 Ford Trophy on 10 November 2018. He made his first-class debut on 29 October 2019, for Wellington in the 2019–20 Plunket Shield season. On making his debut, Snedden became the first fourth-generation cricketer to play first-class cricket in New Zealand.

In June 2020, he was offered a contract by Wellington ahead of the 2020–21 domestic cricket season. He made his Twenty20 debut on 24 December 2020, for Wellington in the 2020–21 Super Smash.

References

External links
 

1992 births
Living people
New Zealand cricketers
Auckland cricketers
Wellington cricketers
Place of birth missing (living people)
Michael